Miroslav Macejko (born 9 April 1992) is a Slovak professional ice hockey defenceman who currently playing for HK Dukla Michalovce of the Slovak Extraliga.

Macejko previously played in the Tipsport Liga for HC Košice, HK Orange 20, MsHK Žilina and HC 07 Detva. On 19 May 2018, Macejko moved to France and signed for Aigles de Nice of the Ligue Magnus. On 23 July 2019, he moved to Russia to play with the ice hockey team Dizel Penza in the Supreme Hockey League.

International play
Macejko played in the 2010 IIHF World U18 Championships for Slovakia.

Career statistics

Regular season and playoffs

International

Awards and honours

References

External links

1992 births
Living people
Slovak ice hockey defencemen
Sportspeople from Košice
HC Košice players
MsHK Žilina players
HC 07 Detva players
Les Aigles de Nice players
Dizel Penza players
HK Dukla Michalovce players
Slovak expatriate ice hockey players in the Czech Republic
Slovak expatriate ice hockey players in Russia
Expatriate ice hockey players in France
Slovak expatriate sportspeople in France